Punicalin is an ellagitannin. It can be found in Punica granatum (pomegranate) or in the leaves of Terminalia catappa, a plant  used to treat dermatitis and hepatitis. It is also reported in Combretum glutinosum, all three species being Myrtales, the two last being Combretaceae.

It is a highly active carbonic anhydrase inhibitor.

Chemistry 
The molecule contains a gallagic acid component linked to a glucose.

References 

Pomegranate ellagitannins
Carbonic anhydrase inhibitors